George Pilkington (3 June 1926 – May 2016) was an English footballer who played as a full back or wing half in the Football League for Rotherham United, Chester and Stockport County.

References

1926 births
2016 deaths
People from Hemsworth
English footballers
Association football fullbacks
Association football wing halves
Rotherham United F.C. players
Chester City F.C. players
Stockport County F.C. players
English Football League players